The provinces of Greece ("eparchy") were sub-divisions of some the country's prefectures. From 1887, the provinces were abolished as actual administrative units, but were retained for some state services, especially financial and educational services, as well as for electoral purposes. Before the Second World War, there were 139 provinces, and after the war, with the addition of the Dodecanese Islands, their number grew to 147. According to the Article 7 of the Code of Prefectural Self-Government (Presidential Decree 30/1996), the provinces constituted a "particular administrative district" within the wider "administrative district" of the prefectures. The provinces were finally abolished after the 2006 local elections, in line with Law 2539/1997, as part of the wide-ranging administrative reform known as the "Kapodistrias Project", and replaced by enlarged municipalities (demoi).

Organization

Provincial administration consisted of two parts: a collective Provincial Council and an eparch. Members of the Provincial Council were the prefectural councillors of the respective province. The eparch or sub-prefect was the prefectural councillor who received the most votes in the prefectural elections.

List

This is a list of the former provinces of Greece and their capitals, sorted by prefecture, as they stood in 1991:

Achaea
Aigialeia Province - Aigio
Kalavryta Province - Kalavryta
Patras Province - Patras
Aetolia-Acarnania
Missolonghi Province - Missolonghi
Nafpaktia Province - Nafpaktos
Trichonida Province - Agrinio
Valtos Province - Amfilochia
Vonitsa-Xiromero Province - Vonitsa
Arcadia
Gortynia Province - Dimitsana
Kynouria Province - Leonidio
Mantineia Province - Tripoli
Megalopoli Province - Megalopoli
Argolis
Argos Province - Argos
Ermionida Province - Kranidi
Nafplia Province - Nafplio
Arta Prefecture: no provinces
Athens Prefecture: no provinces
Boeotia
Thebes Province - Thebes (Thiva)
Livadeia Province - Livadeia
Chalkidiki
Arnaia Province - Arnaia
Chalkidiki Province - Polygyros
Chania Prefecture
Apokoronas Province - Vamos
Kissamos Province - Kissamos
Kydonia Province - Chania
Selino Province - Kandanos
Sfakia Province - Chora Sfakion
Chios Prefecture: no provinces
Corfu Prefecture (Kerkyra)
Corfu Province - Corfu
Paxoi Province - Gaios
Corinthia: no provinces
Cyclades Prefecture
Andros Province - Andros
Kea Province - Ioulis
Milos Province - Milos
Naxos Province - Naxos (city)
Syros Province - Ermoupoli
Paros Province - Paros
Thira Province - Santorini
Tinos Province - Tinos (town)
Dodecanese Prefecture
Kalymnos Province - Kalymnos
Karpathos Province - Karpathos
Kos Province - Kos
Rhodes Province - Rhodes
Drama Prefecture: no provinces
East Attica
Attica Province (part)
Elis Prefecture
Elis Province - Pyrgos
Olympia Province - Andritsaina
Euboea Prefecture
Chalcis Province - Chalcis
Istiaia Province - Istiaia
Karystia Province - Karystos
Evros Prefecture
Alexandroupoli Province - Alexandroupoli
Didymoteicho Province - Didymoteicho
Orestiada Province - Orestiada
Samothrace Province - Samothrace
Soufli Province - Soufli
Evrytania: no provinces
Florina Prefecture: no provinces
Heraklion Prefecture
Kainourgio Province - Moires
Malevizi Province - Agios Myronas
Monofatsi Province - Pyrgos
Pediada Province - Kastelli
Pyrgiotissa Province - Voroi
Temenos Province - Heraklion
Viannos Province - Pefkos
Grevena Prefecture: no provinces
Imathia
Imathia Province - Veroia
Naousa Province - Naousa
Ioannina Prefecture
Dodoni Province - Ioannina
Konitsa Province - Konitsa
Metsovo Province - Metsovo
Pogoni Province - Delvinaki
Kastoria Prefecture: no provinces
Kavala Prefecture
Kavala Province - Kavala
Nestos Province - Chrysoupoli
Pangaio Province - Eleftheroupoli
Thasos Province - Thasos (town)
Kefallinia Prefecture
Ithaca Province - Ithaca
Kranaia Province - Argostoli
Pali Province - Lixouri
Sami Province - Sami
Karditsa Prefecture: no provinces
Kilkis Prefecture
Kilkis Province - Kilkis
Paionia Province - Goumenissa
Kozani Prefecture
Kozani Province - Kozani
Eordaia Province - Ptolemaida
Voio Province - Siatista
Laconia
Epidavros Limira - Molaoi
Gytheio Province - Gytheio
Lacedaemon Province - Sparti
Oitylo Province - Areopoli
Larissa Prefecture
Agia Province - Agia
Elassona Province - Elassona
Farsala Province - Farsala
Larissa Province - Larissa
Tyrnavos Province - Tyrnavos
Lasithi
Ierapetra Province - Ierapetra
Lasithi Province - Tzermiado
Mirampello Province - Neapoli
Siteia Province - Siteia
Lefkada Prefecture: no provinces
Lesbos Prefecture
Lemnos Province - Myrina
Mithymna Province - Mithymna
Mytilene Province - Mytilene
Plomari Province - Plomari
Magnesia Prefecture
Almyros Province - Almyros
Skopelos Province - Skopelos
Volos Province - Volos
Messenia
Kalamai Province - Kalamata
Messini Province - Messini
Pylia Province - Pylos
Trifylia Province - Kyparissia
Pella Prefecture
Almopia Province - Aridaia
Edessa Province - Edessa
Giannitsa Province - Giannitsa
Phocis
Dorida Province - Lidoriki
Parnassida Province - Amfissa
Phthiotis
Domokos Province - Domokos
Locris Province - Atalanti
Phthiotis Province - Lamia
Pieria Prefecture: no provinces
Piraeus Prefecture
Aegina Province - Aegina
Cythera Province - Cythera
Hydra Province - Hydra
Piraeus Province
Troizinia Province - Poros
Preveza Prefecture: no provinces
Rethymno Prefecture
Agios Vasileios Province - Spili
Amari Province - Amari
Mylopotamos Province - Perama
Rethymno Province - Rethymno
Rhodope Prefecture
Komotini Province - Komotini
Sapes Province - Sapes
Samos Prefecture
Ikaria Province - Agios Kirykos
Samos Province - Samos
Serres Prefecture
Fyllida Province - Nea Zichni
Serres Province - Serres
Sintiki Province - Sidirokastro
Visaltia Province - Nigrita
Thesprotia
Filiates Province - Filiates
Thyamida Province - Igoumenitsa
Margariti Province - Margariti
Souli Province - Paramythia
Thessaloniki Prefecture
Thessaloniki Province - Thessaloniki
Lagkadas Province - Lagkadas
Trikala Prefecture
Trikala Province - Trikala
Kalambaka Province - Kalambaka
West Attica
Attica Province (part)
Megaris Province - Megara
Xanthi Prefecture: no provinces
Zakynthos: no provinces

References

 
Former subdivisions of Greece